T. niger may refer to:
 Tachypodoiulus niger, the white-legged snake millipede or black millipede, a millipede species found in Europe
 Telmatobius niger, a frog species endemic to Ecuador
 Threnetes niger, the sooty barbthroat, a hummingbird species

See also
 Niger (disambiguation)